Orrin W. Robinson is an American philologist who is Professor Emeritus of German at Stanford University. He specializes in Germanic studies.

Biography
Orrin W. Robinson gained his B.A. from Stanford University in 1968, and his Ph.D. in linguistics from Cornell University in 1972. He subsequently became Professor of German at Stanford University. Robinson has since retired from Stanford as Professor Emeritus of German.

Robinson's research centers on English, German and Germanic linguistics. He is the author of numerous works on these subjects.

Selected works
 Old English and its closest relatives: a survey of the earliest Germanic languages, 1992
 Clause subordination and verb placement in the Old High German Isidor translation Orrin W. Robinson., 1997
 Whose German? : the ach ich alternation and related phenomena in standard and colloquial., 2001
 Grimm language : grammar, gender and genuineness in the fairy tales., 2010

References

External links
 Orrin W. Robinson at the website of Stanford University

Living people
American philologists
Anglo-Saxon studies scholars
Cornell University alumni
Germanic studies scholars
Germanists
Linguists of Germanic languages
Stanford University alumni
Stanford University faculty
Year of birth missing (living people)